Larkhall East railway station served the town of Larkhall, in the historical county of Lanarkshire, Scotland, from 1866 to 1951 on the Lesmahagow Railway.

History 
The station was opened on 1 December 1866 by the Caledonian Railway. On the northbound line was the station building with a waiting room on the southbound line, to the east of the platforms was the goods yard and at the east end of the station was the signal box. 'East' was added to the stations name on 1 June 1905 when  opened. The signal box closed in 1940 when the line was singled. It was known as Larkhall East Halt in the 1941 edition of the handbook of stations. The station closed in January 1941 but reopened in July 1945, before closing permanently on 10 September 1951, although it was still used in July 1960 by the Orange Order for their annual walks to commemorate the Battle of Boyne.

References

External links
RAILSCOT - Larkhall East

Disused railway stations in South Lanarkshire
Former Caledonian Railway stations
Railway stations in Great Britain opened in 1866
Railway stations in Great Britain closed in 1951
1866 establishments in Scotland
1951 disestablishments in Scotland